Gumtow may refer to

Places
 Gumtow, municipality and village in Prignitz district in Brandenburg, Germany
 Amt Gumtow, former collective municipality which the municipality of Gumtow was part of from 1992 to 2002; its borders were the same as the current municipality
 Chomętowo, Gryfice County, in West Pomeranian Voivodeship (north-west Poland); called Gumtow when it was part of Germany until 1945
 Chomętowo, Świdwin County, in West Pomeranian Voivodeship (north-west Poland); called Gumtow when it was part of Germany until 1945